Wake Forest Township (also designated Township 19) is one of twenty townships within Wake County, North Carolina, United States. As of the 2010 census, Wake Forest Township had a population of 65,491, a 119.4% increase over 2000.

Wake Forest Township, occupying  in northern Wake County, includes portions of the city of Raleigh and the entirety of the towns of Wake Forest and Rolesville.

References

External links 
 Website for the town of Wake Forest
 Website for the town of Rolesville

Townships in Wake County, North Carolina
Townships in North Carolina